Prem Nagar may refer to:

Cinema
 Prem Nagar (1940 film), a Hindi film
 Prem Nagar (1974 film), a Hindi Film

Places
 Prem Nagar, Bhiwani, a village in the Indian state of Haryana
 Prem Nagar, Uttarakhand, a village in Uttaranchal, India, site of the Indian Military Academy
 Prem Nagar Export Zone, an export zone for the brass industry in Moradabad, Uttar Pradesh, India
 Prem Nagar, Pakistan, site of a Dry Port near Lahore, Pakistan
 Prem Nagar, Hyderabad, Locality of Hyderabad, India 
 Prem Nagar, Delhi, Locality of Delhi near Nangloi

See also 
 Prema Nagar, a 1971 Telugu film